Serbia participated in the Eurovision Song Contest 2008 with the song "Oro" written by Željko Joksimović and Dejan Ivanović. The song was performed by Jelena Tomašević featuring Bora Dugić. In addition to participating in the contest, the Serbian national broadcaster, Radio Television of Serbia (RTS) also hosted the Eurovision Song Contest after winning the competition in 2007 with the song "Molitva" performed by Marija Šerifović. RTS organised the national final Beovizija 2008 in order to select the Serbian entry for the 2008 contest in Belgrade. The national final consisted of two shows: a semi-final and a final on 9 and 10 March 2008, respectively. Twenty entries competed in the semi-final where the top ten qualified to the final following the combination of votes from a three-member jury panel and a public televote. The ten qualifiers competed in the final which resulted in "Oro" performed by Jelena Tomašević featuring Bora Dugić as the winner following the combination of votes from a three-member jury panel and a public televote.

As the host country, Serbia qualified to compete directly in the final of the Eurovision Song Contest. Performing in position 23 during the final, Serbia placed sixth out of the 25 participating countries with 160 points.

Background 

The Serbian national broadcaster, Radio Television of Serbia (RTS), broadcasts the event within Serbia and organises the selection process for the nation's entry. RTS confirmed their intentions to participate at the 2008 Eurovision Song Contest as the host country on 21 June 2007. In 2007, Serbia used the Beovizija national final in order to select their entry and on 6 October 2007, the broadcaster announced the organization of Beovizija 2008 in order to select the 2008 Serbian entry.

Before Eurovision

Beovizija 2008
Beovizija 2008 was the sixth edition of the Beovizija national final organised by RTS in order to select the Serbian entry for the Eurovision Song Contest 2008. The selection consisted of a semi-final featuring twenty songs and a final featuring ten songs to be held on 9 and 10 March 2008, respectively, at the Sava Centar in Belgrade. Both shows were hosted by Nina Radulović, Đorđe Maričić, Kristina Radenković and Branislav Katić, who were selected to be the hosts during a special selection show named Evropsko lice. The two shows were broadcast on RTS1, RTS Sat, in Bosnia and Herzegovina on RTRS, via radio on Radio Belgrade as well as streamed online via the broadcaster's website rts.rs and the official Eurovision Song Contest website eurovision.tv. Originally, the semi-final was to be held on 19 February 2008 while the final was to be held a day later. However, due to the unilateral declaration of independence of Kosovo on 17 February, the festival was delayed.

Competing entries 
Artists and songwriters were able to submit their entries between 6 October 2007 and 1 December 2007. Artists were required to be Serb citizens and submit entries in Serbian, while songwriters of any nationality were allowed to submit songs. At the closing of the deadline, 100 submissions were received. A selection committee reviewed the submissions and selected twenty entries to proceed to the national final. The selection committee consisted of RTS music editors Ana Milićević, Anja Rogljić, Zoran Dašić, Nikoleta Dojčinović, Jelena Vlahović, Bilja Krstić and Miki Stanojević. The selected competing entries were announced on 24 December 2007.

Semi-final 
The semi-final took place on 9 March 2008 where twenty songs competed. The ten qualifiers for the final were decided by a combination of votes from a jury panel consisting of Vladimir Marićić (jazz pianist and composer), Katarina Gojković (actress) and Aleksander Peković (director of RTS music production), and the Serbian public via SMS voting. Guest performers featured Eurovision contestants Laka, Kraljevi ulice and 75 Cents, Tamara with Vrčak and Adrian, Stefan Filipović, Isis Gee and Rebeka Dremelj, which would represent Bosnia and Herzegovina, Croatia, Macedonia, Montenegro, Poland and Slovenia in 2009, respectively. The show also featured a tribute to former Eurovision contestant, Toše Proeski, who represented Macedonia in 2004 and died in October 2007. The tragically deceased singer received a lifetime achievement award.

Final 

The final took place on 10 March 2008 and featured the ten qualifiers from the preceding semi-final. The winner, "Oro" performed by Jelena Tomašević featuring Bora Dugić, was decided by a combination of votes from a jury panel consisting of Petar Janjatović (music journalist), Slobodan Marković (composer) and Nena Kunijević (RTS music editor), and the Serbian public via SMS voting. In addition to the competing entries, the Serbian music industry awards were handed as the interval act.

At Eurovision 
It was announced in September 2007 that the competition's format would be expanded to two semi-finals in 2008. According to the rules, all nations with the exceptions of the host country and the "Big Four" (France, Germany, Spain and the United Kingdom) are required to qualify from one of two semi-finals in order to compete for the final; the top nine songs from each semi-final as determined by televoting progress to the final, and a tenth was determined by back-up juries. As the host country, Serbia automatically qualified to compete in the final on 24 May 2008. The European Broadcasting Union (EBU) split up the competing countries into six different pots based on voting patterns from previous contests, with countries with favourable voting histories put into the same pot. During the semi-final allocation draw on 28 January 2008, Serbia was assigned to broadcast and vote in the second semi-final on 22 May 2008.

The two semi-finals and the final were broadcast in Serbia on RTS1 and RTS Sat with commentary by Dragoljub Ilić and Mladen Popović. The Serbian spokesperson, who announced the Serbian votes during the final, was Dušica Spasić.

Final 
Jelena Tomašević and Bora Dugić took part in technical rehearsals on 17 and 18 May, followed by dress rehearsals on 23 and 24 May. The running order for the semi-finals and final was decided by through another draw on 17 March 2008 and Serbia was subsequently placed to perform in position 23, following the entry from Spain and before the entry from Russia.

The Serbian performance featured Jelena Tomašević in a grey dress and Bora Dugić performing together with three backing vocalists, two of them which performed a choreographed routine, and a guitarist. The stage lighting and background LED screens predominately displayed dark blue colours. The performance also featured the use of a wind machine. The five backing performers that joined Jelena Tomašević and Bora Dugić on stage were: Aleksandar Sedlar Bogoev, Jelena Đurić, Marko Vulinović and Mirjana Nešković. Serbia placed sixth in the final, scoring 160 points.

Voting 
Below is a breakdown of points awarded to Serbia and awarded by Serbia in the second semi-final and grand final of the contest. The nation awarded its 12 points to Macedonia in the semi-final and to Bosnia and Herzegovina in the final of the contest.

Points awarded to Serbia

Points awarded by Serbia

Viewing figures

The Eurovision Song Contest 2008 was watched by 4,562,000 people in Serbia, making it the most watched programme of all time in Serbia.

References

2008
Countries in the Eurovision Song Contest 2008
Eurovision